Stare Miasto is a village in Konin County, Greater Poland Voivodeship, in west-central Poland. It is the seat of the gmina (administrative district) called Gmina Stare Miasto. The village has an approximate population of 1,500.

References

Villages in Konin County